Kemsiyurt is a rural locality (a selo) in Novoselsky Selsoviet, Khasavyurtovsky District, Republic of Dagestan, Russia. The population was 570 as of 2010. There are 7 streets.

Geography 
Kemsiyurt is located 29 km north of Khasavyurt (the district's administrative centre) by road. Terechnoye is the nearest rural locality.

References 

Rural localities in Khasavyurtovsky District